The following is a partial list of parks in Shenzhen, China, sorted in alphabetical order.

List

Theme Parks

Former Parks

See also
List of lakes and reservoirs in Shenzhen

References

 
Shenzhen-related lists